Silver Lake is a town in Lake Township, Kosciusko County, in the U.S. state of Indiana. The population was 915 at the 2010 census.

History
Silver Lake was originally called Silver Lakeville, and under the latter name was platted in 1859. The community's location near Silver Lake caused the name to be selected. The post office at Silver Lake has been in operation since 1854.

The Silver Lake Historic District was listed on the National Register of Historic Places in 1992.

Geography
Silver Lake is located at  (41.072434, -85.890427).

Demographics

2010 census
As of the census of 2010, there were 915 people, 366 households, and 244 families living in the town. The racial makeup of the town was 97.7% White, 0.9% African American, 0.2% Native American, 0.2% Asian, 0.1% from other races, and 0.9% from two or more races. Hispanic or Latino of any race were 1.9% of the population.

There were 366 households, of which 32.5% had children under the age of 18 living with them, 48.6% were married couples living together, 11.7% had a female householder with no husband present, 6.3% had a male householder with no wife present, and 33.3% were non-families. 26.2% of all households were made up of individuals, and 8.5% had someone living alone who was 65 years of age or older. The average household size was 2.46 and the average family size was 2.91.

The median age in the town was 38.1 years. 23.5% of residents were under the age of 18; 8.1% were between the ages of 18 and 24; 27.5% were from 25 to 44; 27.1% were from 45 to 64; and 13.6% were 65 years of age or older. The gender makeup of the town was 46.9% male and 53.1% female.

2000 census
As of the census of 2000, there were 546 people, 207 households, and 156 families living in the town. The racial makeup of the town was 95.79% White, 0.37% Native American, 0.18% Asian, 2.75% from other races, and 0.92% from two or more races. Hispanic or Latino of any race were 3.48% of the population.

There were 207 households, out of which 35.7% had children under the age of 18 living with them, 59.9% were married couples living together, 9.7% had a female householder with no husband present, and 24.6% were non-families. 18.8% of all households were made up of individuals, and 8.2% had someone living alone who was 65 years of age or older. The average household size was 2.64 and the average family size was 2.97.

In the town, the population was spread out, with 27.3% under the age of 18, 6.6% from 18 to 24, 29.3% from 25 to 44, 22.9% from 45 to 64, and 13.9% who were 65 years of age or older. The median age was 36 years. For every 100 females, there were 88.3 males. For every 100 females age 18 and over, there were 90.9 males.

The median income for a household in the town was $33,088, and the median income for a family was $36,875. Males had a median income of $31,442 versus $21,000 for females. The per capita income for the town was $13,561. About 9.4% of families and 12.1% of the population were below the poverty line, including 14.5% of those under age 18 and 10.2% of those age 65 or over.

References

External links
 Town of Silver Lake, Indiana website

Towns in Kosciusko County, Indiana
Towns in Indiana